Cade Michael Horton (born August 20, 2001) is an American professional baseball pitcher in the Chicago Cubs organization.

Amateur career
Horton grew up in Norman, Oklahoma, and attended Norman High School, where he played baseball and football. Horton committed to play college baseball at Oklahoma and to join the school's football team as a walk-on. In his senior football season, he passed for 3,084 yards and 26 touchdowns with seven interceptions and also rushed for 1,149 yards and 15 touchdowns. Horton was named the Oklahoma Gatorade Player of the Year in baseball after batting .375 in five games before the season was canceled due to COVID-19.

Horton tore the ulnar collateral ligament in his pitching elbow prior to the start of his freshman season, requiring him to undergo Tommy John surgery and redshirt the year. He began his redshirt freshman season playing third base and occasionally pitching in relief while he was still recovering from his elbow surgery. Horton was later moved to the Sooners' starting rotation.

Professional career
Horton was selected in the first round with the seventh overall selection by the Chicago Cubs of the 2022 Major League Baseball draft. He signed with the team for $4.45 million.

References

External links

Oklahoma Sooners bio

Living people
Baseball players from Oklahoma
Baseball pitchers
Oklahoma Sooners baseball players
2001 births